Chlormerodrin is a mercurial diuretic commercially traded from 1952 until 1974 that was once used to treat patients with heart failure, but is no longer in widespread use. The radiolabelled form (197Hg & 203Hg) had also been used for medical imaging of the kidney and brain and the 197Hg form was even considered a contender for 99mTc by some physicians, but was ultimately discontinued by the FDA in 1989.

References

Mercurial diuretics
Ureas
Withdrawn drugs
X